Firefly Estate, located  east of Oracabessa, Jamaica, is the burial place of Sir Noël Coward and his former holiday home. It is now listed as a National Heritage Site by the Jamaica National Heritage Trust. Although the setting is Edenic, the house, built in 1956, is surprisingly spartan, considering that he often entertained jet-setters and royalty. The building has been transformed into a writer's house museum.

History
Noël Coward's mountaintop Jamaican home and burial site was originally owned by the infamous pirate and one-time governor of Jamaica, Sir Henry Morgan (1635-1688). The property offered a commanding view of the St. Mary harbour, and Morgan used it as a lookout. As part of the hideaway, Morgan had caused a secret escape tunnel to be dug, opening at Port Maria.

Named for the luminous insects seen in the warm evenings, Firefly estate has entertained a wide range of guests, including both the Queen Mother and Queen Elizabeth II, Sir Winston Churchill, Lord Olivier, Sophia Loren, Dame Elizabeth Taylor, Sir Alec Guinness, Peter O'Toole, Richard Burton, and neighbours Errol Flynn, Ruth Bryan Owen, and Ian Fleming.

The Firefly art studio holds Coward's paintings and photographs of his coterie of famous friends, including Laurence Olivier, Errol Flynn, and Marlene Dietrich.

Of his time at the Firefly estate, Coward wrote in his diary: "Firefly has given me the most valuable benison of all: time to read and write and think and get my mind in order . . . I love this place, it deeply enchants me. Whatever happens to this silly world, nothing much is likely to happen here."  Writing, he believed, came easier when he was here, "the sentences seemed to construct themselves, the right adjectives appeared discretely at the right moment. Firefly has magic for me. . . ."

Coward died of myocardial infarction at Firefly on 26 March 1973, aged 73, and is buried under a marble slab in the garden, near the spot where he would sit at dusk watching the sun set as he sipped his brandy with ginger ale chaser and looked out to sea and along the lush green coast spread out beneath him. A statue of him gazing out over the blue harbour graces the lawn. The stone hut on the lawn that was once a lookout for pirate Henry Morgan, then converted to a bar by Sir Noël, is now a gift shop and restaurant.

On one of Firefly's walls is written his last poem.  It begins:
When I have fears, as Keats had fears,
Of the moment I'll cease to be,
I console myself with vanished years,
Remembered laughter, remembered tears,
And the peace of the changing sea.

References

External links
 
 Aerial view

Buildings and structures in Saint Mary Parish, Jamaica
Tourist attractions in Saint Mary Parish, Jamaica
Museums in Jamaica
Monuments and memorials in Jamaica
Literary museums in Jamaica
Historic house museums in Jamaica
Houses completed in 1956